Patricia Jabbeh Wesley is a Liberian (African Diaspora) poet and writer and Professor of English and Creative Writing at Penn State University. She is a Liberian Civil War survivor who immigrated to the United States with her family in 1991, and the author of six books of poetry and a children's book, as well as an anthology editor. Jabbeh Wesley also founded, chairs, and teaches in the educational/humanitarian organization Young Scholars of Liberia.

Biography
Jabbeh Wesley was born in Monrovia, the capital city of Liberia. She then returned to her familial village of Tugbakeh in the Maryland region for boarding school, where she learned the Grebo language after first learning English. She attained her BA at the University of Liberia, her MS at Indiana University, and her PhD at Western Michigan University.

Jabbeh Wesley is the author of six books of poetry: Before the Palm Could Bloom: Poems of Africa (New Issues Press), Becoming Ebony (Southern Illinois University Press), The River is Rising (Autumn House Press), Where the Road Turns (Autumn House Press), When the Wanderers Come Home (University of Nebraska Press), and Praise Song for My Children: New and Selected Poems (Autumn House Press). She is also the author of a children's book, In Monrovia, The River Visits the Sea (One Moore Book).

She joined the nonprofit organization Writing For Peace because her career in writing "has been about giving voice to the voiceless in a world constantly at war." She also operates her own popular blog, Patricia Jabbeh Wesley's International Blog on Poetry for Peace, in which she tries to get readers to think "about the things that bother the world."

Influences and themes 
Although identifying herself as African, Liberian, and Grebo, she has also been shaped by Western influences. She acknowledges and accepts her hybridity of cultures as part of her identity while still calling herself a "a strong Africanist, believing in the values I was taught as an African Child." Her poetry's attitude shifts between critical, bemused, revelatory, celebratory, and mournful, as she discusses both her American and Liberian lives. Jabbeh Wesley constantly makes the reader aware of her exile. The vantage point of being an outsider to both the United States and postwar Liberian cultures permits a wide-awake honesty and fresh analysis of cultures, politics, gender relations, and attitudes. 

Jabbeh Wesley has had numerous strong mothers, including her grandmother, mother, stepmother, and her mother-in-law. Even though the Grebo culture is mostly patriarchal, "it is in reality a matriarchal society, where the women figures have their place as the strong pillars of community and society. Mothers are important because they actually are in charge of the homes, the children, etc., and sometimes of business."  

Jabbeh Wesley survived the Liberian Civil War, the event that influences and inspires most of her work. She is Christian, and her work incorporates and refers frequently to biblical themes and passages.

Personal life 
She currently lives with her family in west-central Pennsylvania and has taught at Pennsylvania State University and Indiana University of Pennsylvania. She is a mother, raising the next generation of Liberian children far from the coast of Western Africa.

Awards 
 2022 Recipient/Winner 2023, Theodore Roethke Memorial Poetry Award
 2002 Crab Orchard Series in Poetry Winner
 Victor E. Ward Foundation Crystal Award for Contributions to Liberian Literature
 Irving S. Gilmore Emerging Artist Grant from the Arts Council of Greater Kalamazoo
 World Bank Fellowship
 2011 President Barack Obama Award

 Penn State University AESEDA Collaborative Grant for research on Liberian Women's Trauma stories
2011 Institute of Arts (IAH) Fellowship from Penn State
2016 WISE Women Literary Arts Award from Wise Women of Blair County, Pennsylvania
2020 Humanities Institute Fellowship from Penn State University

Publications 
 Before the Palm Could Bloom (1998)
 Becoming Ebony (2003)
 The River is Rising (2007)
Where the Road Turns (2010)
 In Monrovia, the River Visits the Sea (2012)
When the Wanderers Come Home (2016)
DoveTales Anthology: One World, One People (2019) (Editor)
Praise Song for My Children: New and Selected Poems (2020)

Recent reviews/scholarly articles, books/interviews

https://nobelwomensinitiative.org/activist-spotlight-poet-patricia-jabbeh-wesley/

https://www.poetryfoundation.org/poets/patricia-jabbeh-wesley

https://www.youtube.com/watch?v=8eZeb8b4qVs

https://www.youtube.com/watch?v=DFLLrR06NSs

https://www.youtube.com/watch?v=Bmc9BPgH3UE

http://www.centreforafricanpoetry.org/magazine/interviews/patricia-jabbeh-wesley/    

http://news.psu.edu/story/164679/2010/09/20/english-professors-poem-chosen-newspaper-column-and-magazine

http://mmofraghana.org/uncategorized/march-poem-get-out-of-here-boys/attachment/pjwesley

http://www.calvin.edu/news/2003-04/wesley.htm

https://muse.jhu.edu/login?auth=0&type=summary&url=/journals/interdisciplinary_literary_studies/v016/16.2.eze.pdf

http://galatearesurrection24.blogspot.com/2015/05/two-books-by-patricia-jabbeh-wesley.html

http://www.halherring.com/files/PDF/Interviews/DreamingofHome.pdf

http://allafrica.com/stories/201410151808.html

http://www.thepatrioticvanguard.com/interview-with-liberian-prize-winning-poet-professor-patricia-jabbeh-wesley

http://www.iup.edu/magazine/page.aspx?id=43085

http://chqdaily.com/tag/patricia-jabbeh-wesley/

http://weekendamerica.publicradio.org/display/web/2008/11/29/bringing_poetry_home

http://www.eng.ntnu.edu.tw/files/writing/1921_c2ba4bfc.pdf

http://news.psu.edu/story/141051/2005/11/02/research/surviving-war-and-living-again

References

living people
Liberian poets
Liberian women writers
Year of birth missing (living people)
People from Monrovia